Junius Ralph Magee was a bishop of the Methodist Episcopal Church and The Methodist Church, elected in 1932.

Birth and family
He was born 3 June 1880 in Maquoketa, Iowa, the son of John Calvin and Jane Amelia (Cole) Magee.  Junius married Harriet Ammie Keeler 10 September 1902.  They had two children:  J. Homer and Dorothy J.  Mrs. Magee died in October 1943.

Education
Junius was educated at the Iowa State Teachers College, earning the B.Di. degree in 1901.  He continued his education at Morningside College, earning the Ph.B. degree in 1904.  He then entered the Boston University School of Theology, earning the S.T.B. degree in 1910.  Junius was a member of the honorary fraternities Pi Gamma Mu and Pi Kappa Delta.

Honorary degrees
Bishop Magee was awarded the LL.D. degree in 1931 by his alma mater, Morningside College.  Upper Iowas University honored him with the D.D. degree in 1921.  The College of Puget Sound awarded him the L.H.D. in 1932.

Ordained ministry
Rev. Magee was ordained in the M.E. Church in 1906.  He served the following appointments in Iowa:  Rustin Ave. in Sioux City (1902–04); Paullina (1904–07). Rev. Magee then served these appointments in Massachusetts:  Falmouth (1907–11); First Church, Taunton (1911–14); Daniel Dorchester Memorial Church, Boston (1914–19); St. Mark's Church, Brookline (1919–21).  Rev. Magee then transferred to Washington state, where he served these appointments:  First Church, Seattle (1921–28); then Superintendent of the Seattle District (1929–32).  Rev. Magee was elected a delegate to General Conferences in 1928 and 1932.

Episcopal ministry
Upon his election to the Episcopacy, Bishop Magee was assigned to the St. Paul episcopal area (1932–39).  In the newly formed Methodist Church, Bishop Magee was assigned the Des Moines Area (1939–44), followed by the Chicago Area (1944- ).

Service to the Greater Church and Community
As Bishop Magee also served as President of the Board of Pensions of The Methodist Church, Inc. in Illinois, and of the Board of Education of the Church.  He served as a member of the Board of Missions, the Board of Lay Activities, and the Commission on Overseas Relief.

In St. Paul, Bishop Magee served as the President of Hamline University, 1933-34.  In Seattle he served on the Mayor's Commission on Unemployment (1931).  In Chicago he served on the Mayor's V-E Day Committee.

References
 Howell, Clinton T., Prominent Personalities in American Methodism, Birmingham, Alabama:  The Lowry Press, 1945.

See also
List of bishops of the United Methodist Church

Bishops of the Methodist Episcopal Church
Bishops of The Methodist Church (USA)
1880 births
University of Northern Iowa alumni
Morningside University alumni
Boston University School of Theology alumni
Heads of universities and colleges in the United States
20th-century Methodist bishops
Year of death missing